Azidamfenicol is an amphenicol antibiotic, which has similar profile to chloramphenicol. It is used only topically, as eye drops and ointment for treatment of susceptible bacterial infections.

References

Nitrobenzenes
Amphenicols
Diols
Phenylethanolamines
Acetamides
Organoazides